Werner Weber (born 17 February 1939) is a Swiss sprint canoer who competed in the early 1960s. At the 1960 Summer Olympics in Rome, he was eliminated in the repechages of the K-1 4 × 500 m event.

References
Sports-reference.com profile

1939 births
Canoeists at the 1960 Summer Olympics
Living people
Olympic canoeists of Switzerland
Swiss male canoeists
Place of birth missing (living people)